The University of Saskatchewan began in 1907 and has operated teams that compete with others since 1911. The term Huskie Athletics is defined as those student athletes from the University of Saskatchewan that compete in elite interuniversity competition administered by U Sports and its members, both as regions and as individual institutions.

The University of Saskatchewan is a member of the Canada West Regional Association, one of four such associations within U Sports. The Huskie Athletics program is administered at the University of Saskatchewan by the college of Kinesiology. At various times in its history, Huskie Athletics has offered teams in 24 different sports. At present date, there are 15 teams in the following sports: men's Canadian football and both men's and women's teams in basketball, cross country, ice hockey, soccer, track and field, volleyball, and wrestling.

Both the football and soccer teams play their home games at Griffiths Stadium, while the men and women's hockey teams play at Merlis Belsher Place.

Awards and standings
The Huskies are year after year one of the top sport schools in Canada.  The football team is recognized as one of the best programs in U Sports.  The football team has won the Vanier Cup as National Champions on 3 occasions (1990, 1996, and 1998) and have been runners up on 6 occasions since 1989.

The men's volleyball has been national champions on four occasions, in 1979, 1988, 1999, and 2004. They continue to have a strong team each year. The U of S Huskies have also recently achieved success in men's and women's basketball, and wrestling.

The most successful Huskie team is the Men's and Women's Track and Field teams. Combined they have won the Canada West conference championship 38 times and the national championships 12 times. Most of these championships were won under the leadership of Lyle Sanderson.

Championships

Note: The Huskies no longer participate in Field Hockey or Swimming and Diving.

Huskies football

The football program at the University of Saskatchewan is one of the more successful programs. They have captured 18 Canada West championships, appeared in 9 Vanier Cup games, winning 3 of them. They play their games at Griffiths Stadium and have hosted many playoff games, including the 2006 Vanier Cup.

Ice hockey

Huskies men's hockey 
The University of Saskatchewan men's hockey team played their first season in 1909–1910. The current program consists of former major junior and junior A hockey players from across Canada. Since 2018, the Huskies play their home games at Merlis Belsher Place, which replaced Rutherford Arena. The Huskies won their ninth Canada West Championship during the 2015–2016 season. In 2017, the Huskies lost the University Cup final by a score of 5–3 to the University of New Brunswick. In 1983, the Huskies won their only University Cup.

The Huskies have a list of alumni who have played or coached in the National Hockey League. Among those included are Mike Babcock, the former coach of the Toronto Maple Leafs, and Todd McLellan, the current coach of the Los Angeles Kings. In 2017, Huskie's goaltender Jordan Cooke was the first active U Sports player to be named to Team Canada's Spengler Cup roster.

Huskies women's hockey

Notable alumni

Basketball

 , CIS 4x All Canadian, CIS 2x Nann Copp Trophy Winner, Canadian National Team player
 Andrew Spagrud, 2003–04 CIS Dr. Peter Mullins Trophy winner

Cross-Country
Jamie Epp, 2xCIAU/CIS Champion and MVP (2000, 2002), 4xAll XC All Canadian, 5x Canadian National Team Member (1999 World Jr XC, 1999 Pan Am Jr Track, 2000 & 2002 FISU XC, 2003 World Sr. XC).  Was also a 12x CIAU/CIS medallist in Track and Field

Hockey

Men's
Jon Barkman, forward, 2001–02 CIS Senator Joseph A. Sullivan Award winner, 2001–02 CIS R.W. Pugh Award winner
Robin Bartel, former defense, Calgary Flames and Vancouver Canucks
Jason Becker, defense, 1995-96 CIS Clare Drake Award winner
Dave Chambers, former head coach of the Huskies ice hockey team and the Quebec Nordiques.
Gerry Couture, former forward, Detroit Red Wings, Montreal Canadiens and Chicago Blackhawks
Steve DaSilva, forward, 2008-09 CIS Clare Drake Award winner
Willie Desjardins, forward, 1982-83 CIS Major W.J. "Danny" McLeod Award winner
Dave Dunn, former defense, Vancouver Canucks and Toronto Maple Leafs
Bill Hay, former forward, Chicago Blackhawks
Dave King, former head coach, Calgary Flames and Columbus Blue Jackets, 1979-80 CIS Father George Kehoe Memorial Award winner
Ed Litzenberger, former forward, Montreal Canadiens, Toronto Maple Leafs, Detroit Red Wings and Chicago Blackhawks
Ken Lovsin, former defense, Washington Capitals, 1994 Olympic silver medal, Ice Hockey
Charlie Mason, former forward, New York Rangers, New York Americans, Detroit Red Wings and Chicago Blackhawks
Eddie McCalmon, former forward, Chicago Blackhawks and Philadelphia Quakers
Ross McKay, former goaltender, Hartford Whalers
Earl Miller, former forward, Chicago Blackhawks and Toronto Maple Leafs

Soccer
Kaylyn Kyle, midfielder, former Canadian National Team player, 2012 Olympic bronze medal
Brett Levis, midfielder, FC Tulsa player

Track & Field
Cyprian Enweani, 1988 Summer Olympian, 200 metres, 1988 Summer Olympian, 4 X 100 metre
Kelsie Hendry, 2002–03, 2003–04, 2004–05 CIS Women's Outstanding Track Athlete winner, 2008 Summer Olympian, Pole Vault, 2010 Commonwealth Games, Pole Vault, Bronze Medal
Courtney Hufsmith, 2019 FISU bronze medallist in 1500m Athletics at the 2019 Summer Universiade – Women's 1500 metres

Volleyball
Bryan Fraser, 2009-2014 Canada West Universities Athletic Association All Star Team 2012-2013 & 2013–2014. Canada men's national volleyball team 2015–present, United Volleys 2015–2016, Abiant Lycurgus 2016-2017
Kris Brand, Outside Hitter VC Franken, Indios de Mayaguez, Knack Randstad Roeselare
Tom Graham, 1986-87 CIS Men's Volleyball Coach of the Year winner

Awards and honors
The Saskatchewan Huskies athletics awards are known as the Major 7. The Female Athlete of the Year is awarded the Mary Ethel Cartwright Trophy, while the Male Athlete of the Year is the recipient of the E. Kent Phillips Trophy. Given to the Men's Rookie of the Year is the Howard Nixon Trophy. The Huskies' Female Rookie of the Year is bestowed the Patricia Lawson Trophy.

In recognition of an All-Around Female Athlete that has demonstrated leadership, sportsmanship, academic ability and athletic prowess, the Valerie Girsberger Trophy is awarded. Recognizing a male athlete's highest qualities of sportsmanship and citizenship, the Rusty MacDonald Cup is awarded. The Huskies award for the Coach of the Year is known as the Colb McEwon Trophy. As a side note, the Huskies also recognize trainers with the Dr. Walter Hader Student Trainer of the Year award.

Athletes of the Year
This is an incomplete list

Canada West Hall of Fame
Brent Schneider, Football: 2019-2020 inductee(inaugural class)
Willie Desjardin, Men's Hockey: 2019-2020 inductee(inaugural class)
Huskies, Men's Hockey, 1980-1983: 2019-2020 inductee(inaugural class)
Darcey Busse, Men's Volleyball: 2019-2020 inductee(inaugural class)
Adam Ens, Men's Volleyball: 2019-2020 inductee(inaugural class)
Lyle Sanderson, Men's Track & Field: 2019-2020 inductee(inaugural class)
Gordon Garvie, Men's Wrestling: 2019-2020 inductee(inaugural class)
Jamie Epp, Men's Cross-Country/Track & Field: 2019-2020 inductee(inaugural class)
Sarah Crooks, Women's Basketball: 2019-2020 inductee(inaugural class)
Breanne George, Women's Hockey: 2019-2020 inductee(inaugural class)
Mark Tennant, Women's Volleyball: 2019-2020 inductee(inaugural class)
Huskiettes, Volleyball, 1978-81: 2019-2020 inductee(inaugural class)
Kelsie Hendry, Women's Track & Field: 2019-2020 inductee(inaugural class)
Ethel Mary Cartwright, Builder-General: 2019-2020 inductee(inaugural class)
Dr. Sylvia Fedoruk, Builder- BB,VB,Track: 2019-2020 inductee(inaugural class)
Pat Jackson, Builder: 2019-2020 inductee(inaugural class)
Val Schneider, Builder: 2019-2020 inductee(inaugural class)
Diane Jones-Konihowski: Women's Track and Field: 2020-2021 inductee

References

External links
 

 
U Sports teams